Pitch Perfect is an American musical comedy media franchise created by Kay Cannon, loosely based on the non-fiction book Pitch Perfect: The Quest for Collegiate a Cappella Glory by Mickey Rapkin. Jason Moore directed the first film, Elizabeth Banks directed the second, and Trish Sie directed the third. Paul Brooks, Max Handelman, and Banks produced the films. The film series features an ensemble cast, including Anna Kendrick, Rebel Wilson, Anna Camp, Brittany Snow, Skylar Astin, Adam DeVine, Ben Platt, Alexis Knapp, Hana Mae Lee, Ester Dean, Hailee Steinfeld, Chrissie Fit, John Michael Higgins, and Banks; while the television series stars DeVine. The series is distributed by Universal Pictures.

The franchise is about a female a cappella group, called The Barden Bellas, that takes part in the International Championship of Collegiate A Cappella (ICCA) in order to become the best collegiate a cappella group in the world and sing in front of the president of the United States.

The first film was a sleeper hit. It received positive reviews and was financially successful, grossing over $115 million against a $17 million budget. A sequel was made and released in 2015, to greater financial success, grossing over $287 million against a $29 million budget. The series has since gained a cult following, grossing $565 million worldwide, and the second film is the highest grossing musical comedy film of all time, beating School of Rocks record.

Films

Pitch Perfect (2012)

Beca Mitchell (Anna Kendrick), a rebellious and unwilling freshman at Barden University, joins a disgraced all-female a cappella group, The Barden Bellas, directed by uptight senior student Aubrey Posen (Anna Camp). The film follows the unlikely new formation of The Barden Bellas which has to struggle to win at the collegiate a cappella competition.

Pitch Perfect 2 (2015)

Set three years after the first film, The Bellas are the leading a cappella group with Beca as the leader until Fat Amy (Rebel Wilson) accidentally rips her pants during a performance, effectively suspending the group. They could be reinstated if they win an international a cappella competition, where no American team has ever won. With new members, tough competition, and doubts everywhere from almost everyone, they try to regain their glory, only to find it harder than it looks with their focus being split up and losing their harmony along the way.

Pitch Perfect 3 (2017)

Two years after the second film, the now graduated Bellas find themselves split apart and struggling with their real life jobs. However, after a brief reunion, Aubrey comes up with an idea to perform for the USO tour, which will reunite them for a series of shows. The Bellas go overseas for the USO where they find out that they are actually competing with other bands on tour to be the opening act for DJ Khaled.

Television series

Pitch Perfect: Bumper in Berlin (2022–present)

In September 2021, it was announced that a television series based on the film series had been ordered at Peacock for a 2022 release, with Adam DeVine reprising his role as Bumper Allen. It will be written by Megan Amram, who will also serve as executive producer and showrunner and Elizabeth Banks serve as executive producer. In March 2022, Sarah Hyland, Jameela Jamil and Lera Abova were announced to be joining the cast alongside Flula Borg, who is reprising his role as Piëter Krämer from the second film.

Development of the first film

Development and production
The film is based on Mickey Rapkin's non-fiction book Pitch Perfect: The Quest for Collegiate a Cappella Glory. Rapkin, senior editor at GQ magazine, spent a season covering competitive collegiate a cappella. He followed the Tufts University Beelzebubs, the University of Oregon Divisi (the loose inspiration for the Bellas), and the University of Virginia Hullabahoos, who have a cameo in the film. Rapkin's book mainly covers the singing, groupies, partying and rivalries. Two members of the a cappella community, Deke Sharon, who founded the International Championship of College A Cappella, and Ed Boyer, both in Rapkin's book, were brought on board to arrange songs, produce vocals and act as on-site music directors, where they ran a month-long "a cappella boot camp". The film was shot throughout campus and inside buildings at Louisiana State University in Baton Rouge, Louisiana. Elizabeth Banks is a co-producer and a co-star in the film.

Casting
The casting department included Justin Coulter, Rich Delia, Allison Estrin, and Michael Roth. One of the producers, Paul Brooks, stated "First and foremost, we were looking for actors who had comedic instincts and thought we'd get lucky with terrific actors who happened to be funny and can actually dance and maybe sing. It turns out we did get lucky with our cast!" According to producer Elizabeth Banks, "The character Beca required someone who was grounded, who has a strong point of view on the world, who is funny and empathetic and someone who we can all relate to and root for." Of Kendrick she said, "Anna is all those things, and there was no other choice." Fellow producer Brooks said "I saw Anna in Up in the Air and thought it was the most exquisite, elegant, balanced, sublime performance. Anna was our first choice for the role of Beca."

When casting the character of Jesse, Max Handelman said "We were looking for a young John Cusack-type guy. We needed to find someone who was kind of awkward but not a geek, but not so cool that you're not rooting for him." Skylar Astin was chosen for the role. Of Astin's audition, Banks said the chemistry between Skylar and Anna when they read together prior to shooting was "clear and they were able to riff off each other."

Rebel Wilson was recognized for her performance in the comedy film Bridesmaids upon auditioning for the role of Fat Amy, which she won instantly. Moore recalled Wilson singing Lady Gaga's "The Edge of Glory" while beating "on her chest with her fists." He said, "I didn't even hear the end of the song because I was laughing so hard. There's this beautiful openness to the way Rebel approaches everything, and that's what works great for the character. She's fearless." Adam DeVine was personally chosen by Banks and Handelman for the role of Bumper after they saw him on the television series Workaholics. Banks said that she and her husband are "big Workaholics fans," and after watching one night during the film's casting, they saw DeVine and "immediately thought" he would be a good choice for Bumper. He initially declined because he was not a singer. DeVine eventually surprised Banks and Handelman with his vocal skills. Anna Camp was chosen for the role of Aubrey. Producer Max Handelman said, "Elizabeth and I were huge fans of Anna's from True Blood. Aubrey is set up as the antagonist for Beca, and Beca's already a bit hard-edged, so it was so important to find an actress who could play Aubrey as someone who could marshal the crazy but also was sympathetic."  Kelley Jakle was brought in as a "ringer" due to her past experience as a two-time ICCA champion with the SoCal VoCals and had also appeared on two seasons of The Sing-Off.

Cast and crew

Cast

Note: A light grey cell indicates a character who did not appear in that film or the television series.

Crew

Reception

Critical response

Box office performance

References

External links
IMDb links for Pitch Perfect films
 
 
 
 

2010s musical comedy films
American musical comedy films
English-language films
Universal Pictures franchises
Film series introduced in 2012
Trilogies
Films adapted into television shows
Jukebox musical films
Pitch Perfect (films)